The Kazakhstan women's national handball team is the national handball team of Kazakhstan and takes part in international handball competitions.

The team participated in the 2009 World Women's Handball Championship in China, finishing 22nd. At the 2011 World Women's Handball Championship in Brazil they finished 19th.

They won the title at the 2010 Asian Women's Handball Championship.

Results

Summer Olympics
 2008 – 10th

World Championship
 2007 – 18th
 2009 – 22nd
 2011 – 19th
 2015 – 22nd
 2019 – 22nd
 2021 – 24th
 2023 – Qualified

Asian Championship

Current squad
Squad for the 2021 World Women's Handball Championship.

Head coach: Lyazzat Ishanova

References

External links
IHF profile

Women's national handball teams
Hand
National team